Encheloclarias kelioides is a species of airbreathing catfish found in Indonesia, Malaysia and Singapore.  This species reaches a length of 6.5 cm (2.6 inches) SL.

Sources
 
 

Encheloclarias
Fish described in 1993
Taxonomy articles created by Polbot